Mount Itamos is a mountain range in Chalkidiki, northern Greece. It stretches across the Sithonia peninsula (the "second" or "middle finger" of Chalkidiki) in the middle from north to south.

Peaks
The peaks of Mount Itamos are:

Itamos, 817 m, east of Parthenonas
Astrapokameno, 808 m, east of Parthenonas
Psilos, 753 m, east of Parthenonas
Dragoudeli, 689 m, west of Sarti
Paklara, 598 m, west of Sarti
Karvounas, 567 m, southeast of Vourvourou
Melitonas, 468 m, southeast of Porto Carras
Trapezi, 366 m, south of Sarti
Petrus Rock, 298 m, southeast of Nikiti

Description
The area of the mountain range is about 27,000 hectares (270 square kilometres). Land use is about 70% forestry, 30% agriculture, 10% tourism/recreation. Most of the land is located within the Oros Itamos - Sithonia Protected Area.

The mountain range is predominantly covered by conifer forests. Forest fires have destroyed large areas of forests in the south of Sithonia around Sarti and Sykia, and in September 2004, east of Neos Marmaras. To protect against the spread of forest fires, wide corridors have been created.

The mountain range has many dirt roads that are popular with mountain bikers. During the winter, many of the roads can become muddy due to frequent rainstorms.

Approximately in the middle of the mountain range, a road stretches from Nikiti to Sykia, from which numerous winding roads lead to the island's main road. Settlements are located on the coast due to the ruggedness of the central mountain range; only Sykia is about 4 km inland. The only higher settlement is the mountain village of Parthenonas, which can be reached from Neos Marmaras by an asphalt road.

In the mountainous area, animal husbandry (primarily goat herding) and beekeeping (numerous beehives) are practiced. In the foothills of the mountain range, wine is grown near Porto Carras.

Gallery

References

Landforms of Chalkidiki
Mountains of Central Macedonia
Mountain ranges of Greece